Head of the Pack is the debut album by Canadian heavy metal band Skull Fist. The album was recorded in 2011 at Phase one Studios/Lenz Entertainment and released on 26 August 2011 by NoiseArt Records and distributed online by Nuclear Blast. distributed by Napalm Records In North America and released by Spiritual Beast Records in parts of Asia. The album received great reviews around the globe which led the band to be named best upcoming band in Terrorizer in early 2012. After leaving the band, Alison Thunderland recorded the drums for the album.

Track listing

Personnel
Zach Slaughter – Lead vocals and guitar
Casey Slade – Bass guitar
Jonny Nesta – Lead guitar
Alison Thunderland – Drums and percussion although left band before the album

External links

https://web.archive.org/web/20110829053015/http://getmetal.org/heavy-metal/8733-skull-fist-head-214f-the-pack-2011.html
https://web.archive.org/web/20120425163030/http://lekosincmetal.blogspot.com/2011/08/skull-fist-head-of-pack-2011-canada.html
http://musicdl.org/other/skull-fist-head-of-the-pack-cd-2011-211/
http://www.discogs.com/Skull-Fist-Head-Of-The-Pack/release/3072175
http://www.skullfist.ca

2011 debut albums
Skull Fist albums